Biodun Stephen is a Nigerian film director, writer and producer, specializing in romantic drama and comedy films. She has been noted for getting inspiration for the title of her films, from the main character names as depicted in the film with Tiwa's Baggage, Ovy's Voice, Ehi's Bitters and Sobi's Mystic as notable examples.

Personal life and education 
Biodun Stephen is married. She is an alumna of Obafemi Awolowo University, where she studied philosophy. After-which, she underwent practical film production training at London Film Academy.

Career 
Biodun Stephen began her film-making career in 2014 with the release of The Visit. The film was praised for its minimal yet insightful cast, story and originality. It received two nominations at the 2016 Africa Magic Viewers Choice Awards in Lagos. During an interview with Tribune on various facets of her career, she recalled that acting was her "first love", but didn't have a breakthrough in it hence her decision to improve by attaining new skills abroad. She describes the provision of a platform to communicate with the world as her motivation for delving into film-making. In 2017, Stephen film, Picture Perfect received five nominations, and won two awards at the 2017 Best of Nollywood Awards, for categories best actor in a lead role (Bolanle Ninalowo) and best use of food in a film. She also won best director award at the 2016 Maya Awards (Africa). Speaking to Guardian on the origin of her love stories, Stephen stated "I draw inspiration from my experiences, my pains, my joys, sad moments in my life and in the lives of people around me". For her directorial role in Tiwa's Baggage, she was nominated for best director at 2018 City People Movie Awards. In August 2018, her film Seven and Half Dates was recommended by Guardian as a film to see in the weekend. In an interview with Nigerian Tribune, Stephen recalled that being nominated for AMVCA has been her most accomplished moment, and provided her with the confidence to continue film-making. She describes Emem Isong and Mary Njoku as individuals within the film sector that inspires her. Her artistry in having some form of titular characters has been highlighted by film critics.

Aside film-making, Stephen is also a radio personality, where she anchors a weekend show titled Whispers.

Filmography

Awards and nominations

References

External links 
 

Living people
Nigerian women film directors
Nigerian women film producers
Nigerian film producers
Obafemi Awolowo University alumni
21st-century Nigerian women writers
Year of birth missing (living people)
21st-century Nigerian writers
Yoruba filmmakers
Nigerian film directors
Nigerian screenwriters
Nigerian radio presenters
Nigerian women radio presenters
Nigerian media personalities